Larisa Neiland Natasha Zvereva were the defending champions and successfully defended their title, defeating Linda Harvey-Wild Conchita Martínez in the final, 6–2, 6–2.

Seeds 
The top four seeds received a bye to the second round.

Draw

Finals

Top half

Bottom half

References

External links 
 ITF tournament edition details

1992 WTA Tour
Ameritech Cup
Virginia Slims of Chicago